The Affair may refer to:
 Affair, a sexual relationship or a romantic friendship or passionate attachment between two people
 The Dreyfus affair, a political scandal that divided France from its inception in 1894 until its resolution in 1906
 The Affair (band), a pop music group formed in 1966

Books
 The Affair (Snow novel), a 1960 novel by C. P. Snow in the Strangers and Brothers series
 The Affair (play) by a 1962 Broadway play by Ronald Millar based on Snow's novel
 The Affair (1965 film), a 1965 Australian TV film
 The Affair (Child novel), a 2011 novel by Lee Child
 The Affair, a novel by Hans Koning 1958
 The Affair, a novel by Santa Montefiore

Film and TV
 There's Always Vanilla or The Affair, a 1971 film directed by George A. Romero
 The Affair, a British television film starring Felix Aylmer
 The Affair (1967 film), a 1967 film directed by Yoshishige Yoshida
 The Affair (1973 film), a 1973 television film starring Natalie Wood and Robert Wagner
 The Affair (1995 film), a television war film starring Courtney B. Vance, Kerry Fox and Ned Beatty
 The Affair (2004 film), a 2004 motion picture directed by Carl Colpaert
 The Affair (2019 film), a 2019 Czech motion picture directed by Julius Ševčík
 "The Affair", an episode of Drake & Josh
 The Affair (TV series), an American television series, 2014–2019

See also
 Affair (disambiguation)